The 1960 St. Louis Cardinals season was the team's 79th season in St. Louis, Missouri and its 69th season in the National League. The Cardinals went 86–68 during the season, a fifteen-game improvement over the previous season, and finished third in the National League, nine games behind the World Champion Pittsburgh Pirates.

Offseason 
 October 13, 1959: Hal Jeffcoat was released by the Cardinals.
 December 2, 1959: Gene Green and Charles Staniland (minors) were traded by the Cardinals to the Baltimore Orioles for Bob Nieman.
 December 4, 1959: Bill Smith and Bob Smith were traded by the Cardinals to the Philadelphia Phillies for Carl Sawatski.

Regular season 
First baseman Bill White and third baseman Ken Boyer won Gold Gloves this year.

Season standings

Record vs. opponents

Notable transactions 
 May 28, 1960: Vinegar Bend Mizell and Dick Gray were traded by the Cardinals to the Pittsburgh Pirates for Julián Javier and Ed Bauta.
 June 15, 1960: Jim Donohue was traded by the Cardinals to the Los Angeles Dodgers for John Glenn.
 August 2, 1960: Marshall Bridges was selected off waivers from the Cardinals by the Cincinnati Reds.
 August 13, 1960: Del Rice was signed as a free agent by the Cardinals.
 September 7, 1960: Del Rice was selected off waivers from the Cardinals by the Baltimore Orioles.

Roster

Player stats

Batting

Starters by position 
Note: Pos = Position; G = Games played; AB = At bats; H = Hits; Avg. = Batting average; HR = Home runs; RBI = Runs batted in

Other batters 
Note: G = Games played; AB = At bats; H = Hits; Avg. = Batting average; HR = Home runs; RBI = Runs batted in

Pitching

Starting pitchers 
Note: G = Games pitched; IP = Innings pitched; W = Wins; L = Losses; ERA = Earned run average; SO = Strikeouts

Other pitchers 
Note: G = Games pitched; IP = Innings pitched; W = Wins; L = Losses; ERA = Earned run average; SO = Strikeouts

Relief pitchers 
Note: G = Games pitched; W = Wins; L = Losses; SV = Saves; ERA = Earned run average; SO = Strikeouts

Farm system 

LEAGUE CHAMPIONS: Tulsa, Winnipeg

References

External links 
1960 St. Louis Cardinals at Baseball Reference
1960 St. Louis Cardinals team page at www.baseball-almanac.com

St. Louis Cardinals seasons
Saint Louis Cardinals season
St Louis